Ludwig Joseph Uhland (1722–1803) was a German doctor and professor of theology.

Life 
Ludwig Joseph Uhland was born at Tübingen on 15 May 1722, where he also died on 15 December 1803.

Works 

 De Hist. Restaurati post Diluv. Orbis ab Exitu Noæ ex Arcausque ad Dispeisionen Gentiuns (Tübingen, 1761);
 De Ordine Vaticiniorum, quæ in Sedecim Prophet. Scripta Extant, Chrionologico (Tübingen, 1778); 
 Annotationes ad Loca quædam Amosi, Imprim. Historica (Tübingen, 1779–80);
 Annotationes in Hoseæ Cap. iii (Tübingen, 1787); 
 Cap. v, vi, 1–3 (Tübingen, 1789); 
 Cap. vi, 4–11; vii, 1–6 (Tübingen, 1790); 
 Cap. viii (Tübingen, 1791); 
 Cap. ix (Tübingen, 1792);
 Dissertatio Exegetica in Hagg. ii, 1–9 (Tübingen, 1789).

See also 

 Ludwig Uhland

References

Sources 

 Schott, Theodor (1895). "Uhland, Ludwig Josef". In Allgemeine Deutsche Biographie (ADB). Vol. 39. Leipzig: Duncker & Humblot. pp. 146–148.

Attribution:

 Pick, B. (1881). "Uhland, Ludwig Joseph". In McClintock, John; Strong, James (eds.). Cyclopædia of Biblical, Theological and Ecclesiastical Literature. Vol. 10.—Su–Z. New York: Harper & Brothers. pp. 625–626. 

1722 births
1803 deaths
18th-century German Protestant theologians
18th-century German writers
Academic staff of the University of Tübingen